Thomas Bernard may refer to:

 Sir Thomas Bernard, 3rd Baronet (1750–1818), English social helper
 Thomas Bernard (Irish politician) (c. 1769–1834), Member of Parliament for King's County, 1802–1832
 Sir Thomas Bernard, 6th Baronet (1791–1883), Member of Parliament for Aylesbury, 1857–1865
 Thomas Dehany Bernard (1815–1904), English Anglican cleric
 Thomas Bernard (1816–1882), Anglo-Irish British Army officer
 Thomas Bernhard (1931–1989), Austrian novelist, playwright and poet

See also

Bernard (surname)